David Stephen (born 26 September 1951) is a South African cricketer. He played in one first-class and one List A match for Border in 1972/73 and 1977/78.

See also
 List of Border representative cricketers

References

External links
 

1951 births
Living people
South African cricketers
Border cricketers